The 65th General Assembly of Prince Edward Island is the 65th sitting of the Legislative Assembly of Prince Edward Island and the 39th since confederation in 1873. The assembly was elected on May 4, 2015 with a re-election for Premier Wade MacLauchlan and the Liberals.

Members
Cabinet ministers are in bold, party leaders are in italic, and the Speaker of the Legislative Assembly is designated by a dagger (†).

 Resigned as an MLA on October 19, 2017.
 Elected in a by-election on November 27, 2017.
 Resigned as an MLA on August 1, 2016.
 Elected in a by-election on October 17, 2016.
 Resigned from Liberal caucus on January 31, 2018.

Party membership

Membership changes

See also
List of Prince Edward Island General Assemblies

External links
The Legislative Assembly of Prince Edward Island, government website

Terms of the General Assembly of Prince Edward Island
21st century in Prince Edward Island